Agalarov is a surname. Notable people with the surname include:
 
Aras Agalarov (born 1955), Azerbaijani-born Russian businessman
Emin Agalarov (born 1979), Azerbaijani singer-songwriter
Hasan bey Agalarov (born 1812), lieutenant general in the Russian military
Kamil Agalarov (born 1988), Russian footballer
Ruslan Agalarov (born 1974), Russian footballer and manager